Sabine Pochert is an East German sprint canoer who competed in the late 1970s. She won a silver medal in the K-4  event at the 1977 ICF Canoe Sprint World Championships in Sofia.

References

East German female canoeists
Living people
Year of birth missing (living people)
ICF Canoe Sprint World Championships medalists in kayak